Old Airport is an area in Bandar Seri Begawan, Brunei. It is the common name given to the former site of the Brunei Airport (hence the name) and is now the location of several government offices.

Government offices 
The former terminal building of the Brunei Airport has become the office of the Government Printing Department. Its vicinity is also the location of various government buildings which belong to two ministries and several government departments. These include:
 Ministry of Education
 Ministry of Development
 Mail Processing Centre
 Public Works Department
 Brunei-Muara District Office
 Public Service Commission
 Department of Electrical Services
 Housing Development Department
 
 Information Department
 Anti-Corruption Bureau
 Agriculture Department
 Survey Department
 Land Department

References 

Geography of Brunei